A Bible society is a non-profit organization, usually nondenominational in makeup, devoted to translating, publishing, and distributing the Bible at affordable prices.  In recent years they also are increasingly involved in advocating its credibility and trustworthiness in contemporary cultural life.  Traditionally Bible society editions contain scripture, without any doctrinal notes or comments, although they may include non-sectarian notes on alternate translations of words, or variations in the different available manuscripts.

History of Bible production
The production and distribution of bibles are issues that have engaged the attention of Christian leaders for centuries. In an extant letter, dated 331, Emperor Constantine requested Eusebius, bishop of Caesarea, to provide him with fifty copies of the Old and New Testaments for use in the principal churches in Constantinople. In 797, Charlemagne commissioned Alcuin to prepare an emended text of the Vulgate; multiple copies of this text were created, not always accurately, in the famous writing schools at Tours.

The first book printed in Europe was the Latin Bible, and Copinger estimates that 124 editions of the Vulgate had been issued by the end of the 15th century. The Italian Bible was printed a dozen times before 1500, and eighteen editions of the German Bible had already been published before Martin Luther's version appeared. From medieval time and then again accompanying the Protestant Reformation, there was a marked increase in interest in the scriptures. Notwithstanding the oppositional attitude adopted by the Roman Catholic Church at and after the Council of Trent (1545-1563), the translation and circulation of the Bible were undertaken with greater zeal, and in a more systematic fashion.

Similar organizations which are not called Bible societies 
The Society for the Propagation of the Gospel in New England was incorporated by an ordinance of parliament in 1649, and reincorporated in 1661, after the Restoration. The Society for Promoting Christian Knowledge (SPCK) was founded 1698. It published the King James Version of the English Bible, and translated and published editions of the Bible in other British languages such as Welsh and Manx. Early in the 18th century it printed editions in Arabic, and promoted the first versions of the Bible in Tamil and Telugu, made by the Danish Lutheran missionaries whom it then supported in south India. The earliest New Testament  published in 1767, and Old Testament 1801 in Scots Gaelic were published by the Society in Scotland for Propagating Christian Knowledge (SSPCK) founded in 1709.

In 1710, the Canstein Bible Institute for the mass production of affordable Bibles was founded in Halle, Brandenburg-Prussia, by Karl Hildebrand, Count of Canstein.

History 
The first organisation called "The Bible Society" was formed in 1779 to distribute Bibles to soldiers and seamen, which became the Naval and Military Bible Society in 1804.  The French Bible Society, instituted in 1792, came to an end in 1803, owing to the Napoleanic Revolution.  Leftover funds were given to Bible production in Welsh.  The modern Bible society movement dates back to the foundation of the British and Foreign Bible Society in 1804 when a group of Christians sought to address the problem of a lack of affordable Bibles in Welsh for Welsh-speaking Christians. Although perceived as Protestant, from the early days the British and Foreign Bible Society was officially ecumenical, and allowed inclusion of the Apocrypha. As a reaction to the occasional inclusion of these books and other issues, the Trinitarian Bible Society was founded in 1831. Pope Gregory XVI in his 1844 encyclical letter Inter praecipuas condemned both Bible societies and "the publication, dissemination, reading, and possession of vernacular translations of Sacred Scriptures" which did not abide by the general rules and decrees of the Catholic Church, and subsequently Catholics did not officially participate in the Society.

The British and Foreign Bible Society extended its work to England, India, Europe and beyond. Auxiliary branches were set up all over the world which later became Bible societies in their own right. Today the United Bible Societies co-ordinates the work of these separate Bible societies. Each Bible society is a non-denominational Christian network which works to translate, revise, print, and distribute affordable Bibles in their own land, according to the demands of all the churches in that land. Nowadays Bible societies print Bibles according to the canons of the countries they are in e.g. Protestant, Catholic or Orthodox, and inter-confessional versions. Bible societies work with other Christian agencies and Bible translations are done on an ecumenical basis, through the Forum of Bible Agencies International.

United States 

In the United States, Bible societies flourished in the first half of the 19th century. In addition to the American Bible Society and the International Bible Society (now "Biblica"), a number of state and regional Bible societies were established prior to the American Civil War and to this day, they have remained active, they distribute Bibles and other works of religious literature to prisons, hospitals and shelters.  Most of these regional societies are affiliated with the National Association of State and Regional Bible Societies.  The oldest Bible society in the United States is the Pennsylvania Bible Society, it was founded in 1808. The Bible society movement spread west as far as Chicago where the Chicago Bible Society was founded in 1840, making it only five years younger than the city itself.

Current societies

United Bible Societies

The United Bible Societies (UBS) is a worldwide association of Bible societies.  As of September 2019 the UBS has 148 member or associated Bible societies, working in more than 200 countries and territories. They include:

 British and Foreign Bible Society (1804)
 National Bible Society of Ireland (1806)
 Bible Society of Northern Ireland (1807)
 Scottish Bible Society (1809)
 Bible Society of India (1811)
 Finnish Bible Society (1812)
 Russian Bible Society (1813/1990)
 Netherlands Bible Society (1814)
 Icelandic Bible Society (1815)
 Swedish Bible Society (1815)
 American Bible Society (1816)
 Norwegian Bible Society (1816)
 Bible Society In Australia  (1817)
 Hellenic Bible Society (1819)
 Bible Society of South Africa (1820)
 Colombian Bible Society (1825)
 Bible Society New Zealand (1846)
 Bible Society of Egypt (1883) 
 Philippine Bible Society (1900)
 Alliance Biblique Française (1901)
 Canadian Bible Society (1906)
 Japanese Bible Society (1937)
 Korean Bible Society (1949)
 Deutsche Bibelgesellschaft (German Bible Society) (1948)
 Sociedade Bíblica do Brasil (Brazilian Bible Society) (1948)
 Hungarian Bible Society (1949)
 Bible Society of Nigeria (1966)
 Slovak Bible Society (1990)
 Ukrainian Bible Society (1991)
 Slovenian Bible Society (1993)

Non-UBS Bible societies

 Naval and Military Bible Society (1779)
 International Bible Society now called Biblica (1809) 
 Trinitarian Bible Society (1831)	
 Pennsylvania Bible Society (1808)
 Watch Tower Bible and Tract Society of Pennsylvania (1884)
 Valera Bible Society (2001)
 King James Bible Society

Other translation groups

 Pioneer Bible Translators (1976)
 Institute for Bible Translation
 Wycliffe Bible Translators (1942)
 Kartidaya (1989)

Non-translation groups

 The Catholic Biblical Federation (1968)
 Gideons International (1899)
 Amity Foundation

People, Peace and Society
In view of the long standing interest in promoting the Bible in many languages around the world, the Bible Society has a long tradition in publishing and distributing peace literature in many languages around the world.

See also 
Bible advocacy
Bible translation
Bible in the Schools (1922)
Massachusetts Bible Society (1809)

Notes

References

Attriburion:

Further reading
 Woodley, E. C. The Bible in Canada. Toronto: J. M. Dent & Sons, 1953. viii, 320 p., ill. N.B.: "The purpose ... is to tell the story of the British and Foreign Bible Society in Canada [afterwards known as the Canadian Bible Society]"—p. 3.

External links
 United Bible Societies website
 The Scottish Bible Society
 BFBS Machine Assisted Translation
 The Bible Society in England and Wales
 The Pennsylvania Bible Society
 The Philippine Bible Society
 The Massachusetts Bible Society
 The International Bible Society
 The Bible Society in New Zealand
 Deutsche Bibelgesellschaft
 The Slovak Bible Society
 The Brazilian Bible Society
 The Valera Bible Society
 The Bible Society of Armenia